Arvo Päiviö Sävelä (30 June 1908, Kankaanpää - 17 November 1976; surname until 1936 Sjöviiki) was a Finnish smallholder and politician. He was a member of the Parliament of Finland from 1948 to 1962, representing first the Social Democratic Party of Finland (SDP), later the Social Democratic Union of Workers and Smallholders (TPSL).

References

1908 births
1976 deaths
People from Kankaanpää
People from Turku and Pori Province (Grand Duchy of Finland)
Social Democratic Party of Finland politicians
Social Democratic Union of Workers and Smallholders politicians
Members of the Parliament of Finland (1948–51)
Members of the Parliament of Finland (1951–54)
Members of the Parliament of Finland (1954–58)
Members of the Parliament of Finland (1958–62)